Molly of Denali (stylized as MOLLY of DENALI) is an animated children's television series produced by Atomic Cartoons in association with WGBH Kids, created by Dorothea Gillim and Kathy Waugh for PBS Kids and CBC Kids. It premiered on July 15, 2019, and is the first American nationally distributed children's show to feature an Alaska Native as the lead character. Thirty-eight half-hours were produced for season 1, which has a 50-minute special as its season finale. A special live-action segment filmed in Alaska airs between the two 11-minute story segments.

On April 6, 2021, it was announced that the show had been renewed for two more seasons, whose second season premiered on November 1, 2021, and ended on October 10, 2022, after 14 episodes. The third season premiered on November 7, 2022.

The series won a Peabody Award in the Children's/Youth category in 2020.

Plot 
The series follows ten-year-old Molly Mabray, an Alaskan Native vlogger from the fictional village of Qyah, and her family, friends Tooey Ookami and Trini Mumford, her Malamute Suki, and other residents. Her family runs the Denali Trading Post.

Cast 
 Sovereign Bill as Molly Mabray, the star of the series. She is of Gwich'in, Koyukon, and Dena'ina Athabascan descent. She has a blog to share with viewers in the lower 48 states about life in Alaska. Her native name is Shahnyaa, which means "one who informs us." She also has a sled dog named Suki.
 Sequoia Janvier (Season 1) and Zane Jasper (Season 2-present) as Tooey Ookami, Molly's best friend
 Vienna Leacock as Trini Mumford
 Jules Arita Koostachin as Layla Mabray, Molly's mother
 Ronnie Dean Harris as Walter Mabray, Molly's father
 Lorne Cardinal as Grandpa Nat
 Adeline Potts as Auntie Midge
 Ellen Kennedy as Singing Moose, Video Voice, and Connie
 Luc Roderique as Daniel, Announcer, and Cowboy on TV
 Michelle Thrush as Shyahtsoo, Aunt Merna, and Grace
 Shawn Youngchief as Mr. Patak, Maurice, Finnegan King, and Olin Benedict
 Katrina Salisbury as Nina
 Rhonda Rees as Barb
 Pamela Jones as Sadie Albert
 Nyla Carpentier as Atsaq, Tooey's mother
 Taran Kootenhayoo as Randall
 Pawaken Koostachin-Chakasim as Oscar
 Cynthia De Pando as Lucia
 Damon Sky Taylor as Ben
 Hyuma Frankowski as Kenji
 Tai Grauman as Mrs. Marsh, the teacher
 Anna Dickey as Vera
 Brendan Sunderland as Jake
 Clay St. Thomas as Travis and Mr. Rowley
 Rebecca Shoichet as Dr. Antigone
 Rukiya Bernard as Violetta Lawrence
 Barbara Patrick as Tatiana
 Macie Juiles as Nadia
 Maxine Miller as Betsy Higginbottom
 Veena Sood as Dr. Amara Batra
 Bethany Brown as Joy Mumford
 Reneltta Arluk as Dr. Begaye, Willow's Mom, and Mary
 Cathy Weseluck as Charlotte (Sassy Ladies of Saskatoon)
 Laara Sadiq as Abigail  (Sassy Ladies of Saskatoon)
 Mary Black as Olivia  (Sassy Ladies of Saskatoon)
 Nanieezh Black as Marjie

Voice direction by Nicole Oliver

Episodes

Series overview

Season 1 (2019–21)

Season 2 (2021–22)

Season 3 (2022–present)

Production
The show's theme song is sung by Phillip Blanchett and Karina Moeller from the band Pamyua, with a fiddle and drum played by Brennan Firth. Portions of the show's dialogue are in the Gwichʼin language.

Broadcast
Molly of Denali premiered on Nat Geo Kids in Latin America in September 2019. It premiered on CBC Kids in Canada on September 2, 2019. CBeebies acquired the UK TV rights to the series in 2022. A podcast was released shortly after its premiere date, this time as a prequel to the series, with season 2 of the podcast premiering in September 2020. Season 3 of the podcast premiered on March 3, 2021.

Reception 
Julia Jacobs of The New York Times wrote "PBS Raises Its Bar for Inclusion."

Awards and nominations

Notes

References

External links 

 Official website
 

2010s American animated television series
2020s American animated television series
2010s Canadian animated television series
2020s Canadian animated television series
2019 American television series debuts
2019 Canadian television series debuts
American children's animated adventure television series
American children's animated comedy television series
American children's animated education television series
American television series with live action and animation
Animated television series about children
Canadian children's animated adventure television series
Canadian children's animated comedy television series
Canadian children's animated education television series
Canadian television series with live action and animation
CBC Kids original programming
English-language television shows
PBS Kids shows
PBS original programming
Television series by WGBH
Peabody Award-winning television programs
Television shows set in Alaska
Fictional characters from Alaska
Native American television series